The Queanbeyan Tigers Australian Football Club, nicknamed the Tigers, is an Australian rules football club that competes in the AFL Canberra. The club is based in Queanbeyan, one of the oldest (proclaimed a town in 1838) and fastest growing municipalities (proclaimed a city in 1972) in New South Wales, that draws players, supporters and administrators from a region of 100,000 people covering the Division of Eden-Monaro.

History

Affiliation 
The team was affiliated with Federal Territory Football League in 1925–26. It was affiliated with the Canberra Australian National Football League in 1927–74, the ACT Australian Football League in 1975–99, AFL Canberra 2000–10 and the North East Australian Football League 2011–present. The club adopted black and gold colours in 1935 after VFL club Richmond donated a set of playing jumpers.

Alan Muir wrote about the team: "The fact that the club survived all of those tough periods was due to the dedication and vision of men like our Foundation President Wal Mason followed by other outstanding Administrative personalities in Jim Prendergast, Maurie Richards, Dick Sydes, Tom Borrowman, Reg Watson, Jack McNamara and Dave Imrie through to more recent administrators covering both football and the licensed club in Ron Fowlie, Gary Bullivant, Van Rakowski, Geoff Gosling and Mark Thompson”.

The Junior Tigers commenced their 66th Year in the ACT Junior Football League in 2013 and provide over 80 per cent of the senior grade teams (10 former local juniors played in the 2012 NEAFL EC Premiership Team when it defeated the Sydney Swans by 30 points in 2012).

Since 1979, the team has been located at Dairy Farmers Park and supporters have raised $800,000 (in addition to grants from the Tigers Licensed Club) to install facilities such as a roofed grandstand, Interchange and Coaches Boxes for home and visiting teams, an Administration Building, ground lighting, a Hall of Fame walk, canteen, goal netting, scoreboards and disabled access.

NEAFL history 

The club entered the NEAFL for the competition's inaugural season in 2011. In 2012 it won the Eastern Conference premiership with an 18.13.121 over Sydney Swans 13.13.91.

Alignment with Sapphire Coast Australian Football League 
Queanbeyan Tigers have appointed Peter Williamson –a former Captain Coach of the Tigers Club who has moved to the South Coast to coordinate a pathway for developing players from all Sapphire Coast Australian Football League Clubs (a region stretching from Bermagui in the North to the Victorian border in the South). For many years the Queanbeyan Tigers sponsored the South East Region Academy of Sport which involved players from clubs in areas such as Bateman's Bay, Bega, Eden and Merimbula, throughout the Bega Valley Shire.

Alignment with Cooma Australian Football 
Queanbeyan Tigers have a formalised development relationship with the Cooma Cats Australian Football Club.

Premierships

Individual honours

Mulrooney Medallists 
Tom Kelly 1938
Merv Strang 1938
Keith Schow 1950
Roy Watterston 1953 and 1954
Tony Wynd 1983, 1988, 1989 and 1990
Steve Cornish 1990
Michael Kennedy 1994
Steve Vizy 1997
Mitch Daniher 2009 
Kel Evans 2018.

League top goalkickers 
G. Lovell (93) 1940
R. Savage (54) 1946
L. White (100) 1956
M. Wheeler (58) 1958
J. Lysewycz (67) 1977
I. Male (63) 1987
D. Skuta (61) 1989
S. Cornish (105) 1990
A. Mapleson (126) 1992
M. Niesen (45) 1997 (97) 1998
L. Ellis (70) 2002, (89) 2003
M. Armstrong (103) 2007, (57) 2008 (57) 2010.

Highest score 
43.37 (295) vs. RAAF on 27 July 1940.

Record finals attendance 
10,000 (approx.) for 1985 Grand Final: Queanbeyan 23.18 (156); Ainslie 14.13 (97).

AFL/VFL players 
There is a list of players who have played at AFL/VFL:
 Robert Anderson (Footscray)
 Wayne Carroll (South Melbourne)
 Kevin Delmenico (Footscray)
 Michael Kennedy (Brisbane Bears)
 Jack Lucas (Sydney Swans)
 Keith Schow (1930–1988) (Collingwood)
 Lindsay White (1922–1977) (Geelong and South Melbourne)
 Roy Williams (Collingwood)

References

External links 
 
 Queanbeyan history at Australian Football.com
 Queanbeyan Australian Football at Sporting Pulse

AFL Canberra clubs
1925 establishments in Australia
Australian rules football clubs established in 1925